The National Society of Certified Healthcare Business Consultants (NSCHBC) is the largest professional society in the United States for persons and firms who provide practice management and financial consulting services to the healthcare industry. NSCHBC was incorporated in 2006 with over 300 charter members from the three prior associations (NAHC, SMD and ICHBC) whom disbanded to form the new entity .

Members provide consultancy in the following areas of expertise:
 Practice management
 Marketing
 Accountancy
 Finance
 Insurance
 HIPAA
 OSHA
 Compliance
 Law
 Billing
 Coding
 Other narrow technical specialties
Most authors in the field of healthcare administration are members. NSCHBC provides an annual continuing education conference, typically in June.

External links
National Society of Certified Healthcare Business Consultants official site

Medical and health organizations based in Virginia
Health industry trade groups based in the United States